This is a list of television stations in Wallis and Futuna.
France O
RFO Tele Wallis Futuna

Wallis and Futuna
Television stations
Television in Wallis and Futuna